The Salairskoye mine is one of the largest lead mines in Russia. The mine is located in southern Russia in Novosibirsk Oblast. The mine has reserves amounting to 25 million tonnes of ore grading 0.13% lead, 2.42% zinc and 7 million oz of silver.

References 

Lead and zinc mines in Russia
Buildings and structures in Novosibirsk Oblast